= ERT AE v Pliroforissis and Kouvelas =

- Court: European Court of Justice
- Full case name: Elliniki Radiophonia Tileorassi (ERT) AE v Dimotiki Etairia Pliroforissis and Sotirios Kouvelas
- Citation: (1991) C-260/89, [1991] ECR I 2925

Case history
- Prior action: ERT 2

Keywords
- Human rights

Elliniki Radiophonia Tileorassi AE v Pliroforissis and Kouvelas (Elliniki Radiophonia Tileorassi (ERT) AE v Dimotiki Etairia Pliroforissis and Sotirios Kouvelas) (1991) C-260/89 is an EU law case, concerning the free movement of services in the European Union.

== Facts ==
ERT, a Greek radio and TV company, had exclusive rights for broadcasting, and claimed an injunction against Pliroforissis and Kouvelas for setting up a rival TV station without a licence. They claimed they should be allowed to operate under the right to free movement of goods and competition law, and the ECHR article 10 on freedom of expression.

== Judgment ==
The Court of Justice held that the derogations from the right to free movement had to be appraised in light of the European Convention on Human Rights.

== See also ==
- European Union law
